Walter Duprey St. Martin (born 7 July 1984) is a Mauritian professional footballer who plays as a defender and midfielder for Mauritian Premier League club Pamplemousses and the Mauritius national team.

References 

1984 births
Living people
People from Rodrigues

Mauritian footballers
Association football defenders
Association football midfielders
AS Vacoas-Phoenix players
Cercle de Joachim SC players
Curepipe Starlight SC players
Pamplemousses SC players
Mauritian Premier League players
Mauritius international footballers